The Bullets would get started on a strong note as they won 9 straight games in November. The Bullets would finish with a record of 50–32. In a competitive Eastern Division, the Bullets finished the season 3rd place.

Offseason

NBA Draft

Roster

Regular season

Season standings

Record vs. opponents

Game log

Player stats
Note: GP= Games played; REB= Rebounds; AST= Assists; STL = Steals; BLK = Blocks; PTS = Points; AVG = Average

Playoffs
In the playoffs, the Bullets were matched up against the New York Knicks for the 2nd consecutive season.
After losing the first 2 games, the Bullets battled back to win the next 2 games. After the Knicks captured Game 5 in New York, the Bullets forced a 7th game with a 96–87 win at the Civic Center.
However, the Bullets would fall in Game 7. The Knicks would go on to win the NBA Championship.

|- align="center" bgcolor="#ffcccc"
| 1
| March 26
| @ New York
| L 117–120
| Earl Monroe (39)
| Wes Unseld (31)
| Wes Unseld (5)
| Madison Square Garden19,500
| 0–1
|- align="center" bgcolor="#ffcccc"
| 2
| March 27
| New York
| L 99–106
| Gus Johnson (28)
| Wes Unseld (21)
| Fred Carter (7)
| Baltimore Civic Center12,289
| 0–2
|- align="center" bgcolor="#ccffcc"
| 3
| March 29
| @ New York
| W 127–113
| Earl Monroe (25)
| Wes Unseld (34)
| Earl Monroe (5)
| Madison Square Garden19,500
| 1–2
|- align="center" bgcolor="#ccffcc"
| 4
| March 31
| New York
| W 102–92
| Earl Monroe (34)
| Wes Unseld (24)
| Fred Carter (7)
| Baltimore Civic Center12,289
| 2–2
|- align="center" bgcolor="#ffcccc"
| 5
| April 2
| @ New York
| L 80–101
| Jack Marin (19)
| Wes Unseld (15)
| Jack Marin (6)
| Madison Square Garden19,500
| 2–3
|- align="center" bgcolor="#ccffcc"
| 6
| April 5
| New York
| W 96–87
| Gus Johnson (31)
| Wes Unseld (24)
| Earl Monroe (5)
| Baltimore Civic Center12,289
| 3–3
|- align="center" bgcolor="#ffcccc"
| 7
| April 6
| @ New York
| L 114–127
| Earl Monroe (32)
| Wes Unseld (16)
| Earl Monroe (6)
| Madison Square Garden19,500
| 3–4
|-

Awards and honors
Gus Johnson, All-NBA Second Team
Gus Johnson, NBA All-Defensive First Team
Mike Davis, NBA All-Rookie Team 1st Team

References

Bullets on Basketball Reference

Washington Wizards seasons
Baltimore
Baltimore Bullets
Baltimore Bullets